North Wahroonga is a suburb on the Upper North Shore of Sydney, in the state of New South Wales, Australia. North Wahroonga is located 23 kilometres north-west of the Sydney central business district, in the local government area of Ku-ring-gai Council. Wahroonga is a separate suburb, to the south.

North Wahroonga is bounded by the F3 Sydney-Newcastle Freeway on the west and the Ku-ring-gai Chase National Park on the north.

History
Wahroonga is an Aboriginal word meaning our home.

European Settlement
In the early days of British settlement in New South Wales, the main activity was cutting down the tall trees which grew there. The Wahroonga area was first settled in 1822 by Thomas Hyndes, a convict who became a wealthy landowner. Later there were many orchards, and when the railway was built it became a popular place for businessmen to build out-of-town residences with large gardens in the 1920s and 1930s.

Population
In the 2016 Census, there were 1,998 people in North Wahroonga. 61.0% of people were born in Australia. The next most common countries of birth were England 7.2% and South Africa 5.4%. 75.5% of people spoke only English at home. The most common responses for religion were No Religion 27.4%, Anglican 21.0% and Catholic 20.8%.

References

Suburbs of Sydney
1822 establishments in Australia
Ku-ring-gai Council
Populated places established in 1822